The 1909 Northern Maori by-election was a by-election during the 17th New Zealand Parliament. The election was held on 20 March 1909.

The seat of Northern Maori became vacant following the death of the sitting member Hone Heke Ngapua on 9 February.

The by-election was won by Te Rangi Hiroa.

Both Hone Heke Ngapua and Te Rangi Hiroa were Liberal Party MPs, and part of the Liberal Government.

Results
The following table gives the election results:

References

Northern Maori 1909
1909 elections in New Zealand
Māori politics